The second round of the 1995 Australian Touring Car Championship was held on the weekend of 24 to 26 February at Symmons Plains Raceway in Launceston, Tasmania. It consisted of two 38 lap races and the "Dash for Cash", a 3 lap sprint for the fastest 10 qualifiers, starting positions for the "dash" were drawn at random.  
Pole and the overall round was won by John Bowe. Peter Brock had his 50th Birthday on race day and won the second race, finishing second overall while team-mate Tomas Mezera finished third overall.

Race results

Qualifying

Dash for Cash

Race 1

Race 2

Championship standings after the event
 After Round 2 of 10. Only the top five positions are included.
Drivers' Championship standings

External links

References

1995 in Australian motorsport
Symmons Plains